Gajendra Singh Shaktawat (24 May 197320 January 2021) was an Indian politician and MLA from Vallabhnagar, Udaipur. He was the son of former home minister Gulab Singh Shaktawat.

Early years
Shaktawat was the younger son of Late Shri Gulab Singh Shaktawat [ Former Home Minister in the Rajasthan Government] . He completed his schooling in Udaipur city, at St. Paul’s school Udaipur  and graduated from Mohanlal Sukhadia University.

Career
Shaktawat was a youth leader in his college days.He was elected as the Member of the Legislative Assembly from Vallabhnagar in 2008 and served as State Minister in the Gehlot Government in 2008 - 2013 and was re-elected as MLA for the second time in 2018 Vidhanshabha elections.

Family
He was married to Preeti Jhala, daughter of Shrimati  Bhagwati Jhala and Late Maharaj Anand Singh Jhala of Bari Sadri , Bhagwati Jhala was a prominent BJP leader. Bhagwati served as Vice President of BJP Rajasthan for four years. Shaktawat had two daughters and one son; Hiteshi Shaktawat [ Married to Lt. Commander Abhijeet Singh Bhati], Gaurvi Shaktawat and Vindhyaraj Singh Shaktawat.

Death
Shaktawat died of COVID-19.

References

1973 births
2021 deaths
Mohanlal Sukhadia University alumni
Deaths from the COVID-19 pandemic in India
Members of the Rajasthan Legislative Assembly